Fujifilm FinePix S9500 or FinePix S9000 is a bridge digital camera released by Fujifilm in 2005 and intended for the enthusiastic amateur. It is a member of the Fujifilm FinePix family and has been superseded by the Fujifilm FinePix S100fs.
It has a long list of advanced prosumer features, like combining having wide-angle ability (28 mm equivalent on a 35 mm camera), full range of manual settings, mechanical zoom ring, high ISO-sensitivities, and some of the versatile features of Live-Preview Digital cameras (LPDs) like movie mode, movable LCD panel, and macro mode.

Main features
RAW option
Movie mode (up to 60 fps)
21.4x total zoom (10.7x optical, 2.0x digital)
Macro mode starting from 1 cm
Hot shoe for external flash
The LCD screen can be tilted up to an angle of 45° and 90° and down to 45°.
Facility to use a cable release.

References

External links

Official links
Fujifilm USA FinePix S9000 page
Fujifilm Australia FinePix S9500 page

Review links 
Review on Neocamera
Review on "Steve's Digicams"
Review on "Digital Photography Review"

Bridge digital cameras
S9500